Robert Richardson (born ) is a British male Paralympic sitting volleyball player, playing as a setter. He is the captain of the Great Britain men's national sitting volleyball team. He competed at the 2012 Summer Paralympics finishing 8th. On club level he played for Surrey Gators in 2012.

See also
 Great Britain at the 2012 Summer Paralympics

References

1982 births
Living people
Volleyball players at the 2012 Summer Paralympics
Place of birth missing (living people)
Paralympic volleyball players of Great Britain
British sitting volleyball players
Men's sitting volleyball players